Duncan's Dam is a dam situated in Lisburn, County Antrim, Northern Ireland, near the Thiepval Army Barracks. It was used until 1941 as a water supply for Lisburn. The dam is now open to the public - there is a path around the water and a playground at the north end. The parking is free.

History
Duncan's Reservoir was in operation prior to 1876 as it appears on the 1876 map. In 1925 a pumping plant was installed at Duncan's Dam using a diesel engine pump. In 1930 an electrically-driven centrifugal pump was installed and in 1941 both pumps were inoperative and Duncan's Dam ceased to be used as a town water supply.

Flora and fauna
The dam is home to ducks, seagulls, occasional swans, Eurasian jay and squirrels and rats

References

Dams in Northern Ireland
Buildings and structures in Lisburn